Vagn Andersen (9 August 1937 – 6 May 2012) was a Danish sports shooter. He competed in two events at the 1972 Summer Olympics.

References

External links
 

1937 births
2012 deaths
Danish male sport shooters
Olympic shooters of Denmark
Shooters at the 1972 Summer Olympics
People from Frederikssund Municipality
Sportspeople from the Capital Region of Denmark
20th-century Danish people